Patterson may refer to:

People
 Patterson (surname)

Places
Canada
Pattersons Corners, Ontario
Patterson Township, Ontario
Patterson, Calgary a neighbourhood in Calgary, Alberta.

United States of America
Patterson, Arkansas
Patterson, California
Patterson, California, former name of Trigo, Madera County, California
Patterson, California, former name of Cherokee, Nevada County, California
Patterson, Georgia
Patterson, Idaho
Patterson, Iowa
Patterson, Louisiana
Patterson, Missouri
Patterson, New Mexico
Patterson, New York
Patterson, Ohio
Lake Patterson, a lake in Minnesota
Patterson Springs, North Carolina
Patterson Heights, Pennsylvania
Patterson Tract, California

Other uses
 Bob Patterson (TV series), American sitcom
C.R. Patterson and Sons, American car manufacturer from 1915 until 1939.
Patterson (radio series), British radio series  by Malcolm Bradbury
 Patterson Companies, a medical supplies conglomerate based in Minnesota
 Patterson function, X-ray crystallography
 Patterson School of Diplomacy and International Commerce, at the University of Kentucky located in Lexington, Kentucky, USA
 Patterson & Sullivan, American art company in San Francisco
 Patterson syndrome, rare disease
 Patterson-UTI, onshore contract drilling services to exploration and production companies in North America
 Patterson Viaduct, spanned the Patapsco River at Ilchester, Maryland, USA
 Patterson–Gimlin film
 Patterson Plantation, a historic house in Durham, North Carolina

See also
 Paterson (disambiguation)
 Pattersonville (disambiguation)